Guagua, officially the Municipality of Guagua, is a 1st class municipality in the province of Pampanga, Philippines. According to the 2020 census, it has a population of 128,893 people.

The town of Guagua belongs to the Second district of Pampanga, along with the towns in the south-western part of the province. The town is bounded on the north by the towns of Bacolor and Santa Rita; on the south by the towns of Sasmuan and Lubao; on the east, Macabebe and Sasmuan; and on the west, Porac and Floridablanca.

History
Wawa (Lán-nâng: 偎岸, Hua-hua), which means "river mouth" (Kapampangan: alua or bukana), was the earliest recorded form of the town's name according to records dating back to 1590. The town is strategically located along a river which played a vital role in trade and transportation during the precolonial era.

Wawa was already a prosperous settlement when Spanish colonists took control of the town in the year 1561, from then on calling it Guagua, which is a Hispanised form of the original name. Indeed, archeological artifacts have been excavated in a nearby town which affirmed the existence of a prehistoric community in Guagua.

Early inhabitants opted to stay in the town because it was here that they could engage in barter trade with people from different islands, along with other means of livelihood like fishing and farming. The navigable river with which the town was endowed allowed shipping vessels to transport commodities to and from other chief localities, particularly the imperial Manila. The first cargo boat to arrive in Guagua was the Doña Dominga on May 7, 1884. Much later it was followed by the steamships Kaibigan and Kababayan, which anchored at the pier in Bgy Santo Niño, better known as the Yañgco Landing.

In 1892, when the Manila–Mabalacat railroad was inaugurated, Guagua was virtually the port of embarkation to and from Manila that served the province. Commerce was further improved when the San Fernando–Guagua line of the railroad was chartered on November 17, 1907.

The Chinese have long been part in Guagua's social and economic mainstream. In the 18th century, they sought refuge in the town to escape discrimination and persecution in Manila. After their near-total slaughter, the Chinese lived in relative peace while they freely practiced their craft and mingled hand-in-hand with the local residents. The Chinese residents were merchants, masons, woodcarvers, carpenters, agriculturists and labourers. Their influence on the cultural and economic life of Guagua cannot be overlooked. The town could not have prospered so well without the economic services provided by the Chinese.

The town took significant part in the revolutionary struggles against the foreign intruders. A house near a church was made a secret cell of the Katipuneros in August 1897. In March 1898, a massacre of all Spanish sympathisers in Guagua marked the end of Spanish colonialism and the outset of American rule. Moreover, during the Philippine–American War and the ensuing Second World War, Guagua became an important battleground.

At the turn of the twentieth century, a new system of education was introduced and made popular and available to the Filipinos.  The Guagua Elementary School in Bgy Santa Filomena, is believed to be the first to be established in the town in the year 1901.  Later in that year, an English teacher came to Betis district and opened a primary school which functioned on a regular basis. In 1908, Colegio del Sagrado Corazón de Jesús (now St Mary's Academy in Bgy San Roque) was established in a two-storey building donated by a charitable matron, in downtown Guagua. Later in 1918, Guagua National Institute (now Guagua National Colleges in Bgy Santa Filomena) was founded at the convent of the Catholic church. Further, in 1941, the then-parish priest felt the need for another high school in town, so he opened Saint Michael's College.

At the overthrow of the Marcos dictatorship in 1986, the local government carried out a sustainable development program to address the town's destitute state. From its income classification in 1986 as a third-class municipality, Guagua grew to a first-class one. Guagua garnered several outstanding citations for its achievement, including of several "Most Outstanding LGU" awards.

Guagua was severely devastated by the eruption of Mount Pinatubo in 1991.

Geography

Topography
The town is mostly flat and is suitable to any kind of development; agricultural, industrial, commercial and others.  It is only a meter above sea level.

Soil type
In general, the soils of Guagua are of recent alluvial origin consisting of fine sand, silt loam and hydrosol.  The average chemical analysis of its top soils is : nitrogen, 0.02 to 0.1; phosphorus, 0.06 to 0.28; potassium, 0.46 to 1.74; organic carbon, 0.41 to 3.02; and pH value (acidity and alkalinity), 5.61 to 6.99.

Flora and fauna
The climate and topographical features of the vast land of Guagua make it ideal for the growing of fruit trees and vegetables.  Among the fruit trees most fitting to be planted are mangoes, guavas, santol, star apples, and bananas.  For vegetables, sitao, upo, ampalaya, gabi and cucumber are the most commonly produced by farmers and which thrive best in the community.

Being void of forest areas, its fauna are mostly the domesticated ones like, chicken, ducks, cattle, and others.

Climate

Barangays
Guagua is divided into four (4) districts, subdivided into 31 barangays:

Poblacion district

Bancal
Plaza Burgos
San Nicolas 1st
San Pedro
San Rafael
San Roque
Santa Filomena
Santo Cristo
Santo Niño

Pangulo district

San Vicente (Ebus)
Lambac
Magsaysay
Maquiapo
Natividad
Pulungmasle
Rizal
Ascomo
Jose Abad Santos (Siran)

Locion district

San Pablo
San Juan 1st
San Jose
San Matias
San Isidro
San Antonio

Betis district

San Agustin
San Juan Bautista
San Juan Nepomuceno
San Miguel
San Nicolas 2nd
Santa Ines
Santa Ursula

San Rafael was constituted from Dock Island in 1956.

Demographics

Religion
Roman Catholic 88%, Iglesia ni Cristo 5%, Members Church of God International 3%, Seventh-day Adventists 2%, Others (Including Protestantism, Buddhism, Islam and Other Religionist) 2%.

Economy

Government

Like other towns in the Philippines, Guagua is governed by a mayor and vice mayor who are elected to three-year terms. The mayor is the executive head and leads the town's departments in executing the ordinances and improving public services. The vice mayor heads a legislative council (Sangguniang Bayan) consisting of councilors from the Barangays of Barrios.

1937 Heritage Town hall
The seat of Government is vested upon the Mayor and other elected officers who hold office at the Town hall. The Sangguniang Bayan is the center of legislation.

Education

For elementary and high school education, Guagua has numerous schools.

Public

Private
Natividad Adventist Elementary School
St. Mary's Academy of Guagua
Psalms Academy of Pampanga
EZEE Center for the Arts and School Inc.
Mary the Queen College (Pampanga), Inc.
Guagua National Colleges
Immaculate Conception Academy
St. Angela's Academy
Pulungmasle Ecumenical Learning Center

Landmarks and List of Cultural Properties
The town has interesting culture and heritage attractions and landmarks, including Rufino Santos Catholic Center, Capt. Ruben P. Sonco Freedom Square, Monument of Aurelio Tolentino (1867-1915). The Guagua National Colleges is also declared as a national historical landmark by the National Historical Commission of the Philippines during the college's 75th Foundation anniversary in 1993.

|}

Santiago Apostol Parish Church

The 1607 Santiago Apostol Parish Church, commonly known as Betis Church is a Baroque (heritage) Church, located in Guagua, Pampanga (Betis Area). It is a Spanish-era church declared a National Cultural Treasure by the National Museum of the Philippines and the NCCA (under R.A. 4896 as amended by P.D. 374 and R.A. 8492), on November 5, 2001 (one of only 26 churches in the country bestowed that honor). It is part of the Ecclesiastical Provinces of the Archdiocese of San Fernando. In 2009, the National Museum installed a marker of its 2005 Proclamation.

Immaculate Conception Parish Church

The first church edifice was constructed in 1587 but was unfortunately razed by fire. The current Church structure was constructed in 1772 under the administration of the Augustinians. The Church was greatly improved in 1862 until 1870. The interiors are simple and the centerpiece attraction is the main altar, a creation of noted local artist Willy Layug. While still simple, the exteriors on the other hand, are marked by massive strength. The Cathedral-type church is located immediately adjacent to the Guagua Municipal Building and houses the Cardinal Santos Catholic Center and the Immaculate Conception Parochial School.

References

External links

Guagua Profile at PhilAtlas.com

[ Philippine Standard Geographic Code]
Philippine Census Information
Local Governance Performance Management System 

Municipalities of Pampanga